Gaillardia suavis is a species of flowering plant in the sunflower family, common names pincushion daisy and perfumeballs. It is native to northern Mexico (Coahuila, Nuevo León, Tamaulipas) and the southern Great Plains of the United States (Kansas, Oklahoma, Texas).

Gaillardia suavis grows in limestone or sandy soils in prairies, desert scrub, or open juniper woodlands. Each head generally has 7-10 red or purple ray flowers, though some heads have no ray flowers. The center of the head has 40-100 pink or purple disc flowers.

References

External links
Chihuahuan Desert Plants, Fragrant Gaillardia (Gaillardia suavis) includes photo

suavis
Flora of Northeastern Mexico
Flora of the Great Plains (North America)
Flora of the United States
Flora of the South-Central United States
Plants described in 1847
Taxa named by George Engelmann
Taxa named by Asa Gray
Flora without expected TNC conservation status